Ahmadabad-e Yalamqani (also Romanized as Aḩmadābād-e Yalamqānī; also known as Aḩmadābād) is a village in Vahdat Rural District, in the Central District of Zarand County, Kerman Province, Iran. At the 2006 census, its population was 963, in 229 families.

References 

Populated places in Zarand County